Vlado Ilievski (born 19 January 1980) is a former Macedonian professional basketball.

Professional career
During his career, Ilievski played for Nemetali Ogražden, KK Partizan, Antbirlik Antalya, FC Barcelona Bàsquet, Lottomatica Roma, VidiVici Bologna, Montepaschi Siena, Tau Cerámica, KK Union Olimpija, Anadolu Efes and Lokomotiv Kuban.

On 28 September 2012 Ilievski signed a one-year contract with Croatian team Cedevita Zagreb.
On 12 November 2013 Ilievski signed a contract with club ČEZ Nymburk from Czech Republic.

On 7 November 2014 he signed with Cibona Zagreb.

On 10 July 2015, he signed with Italian club Orlandina Basket.

On 7 September 2016, he signed with Rabotnički.

On 9 June 2017, Vlado Ilievski announces his retirement from basketball.

Career statistics

Euroleague

|-
| style="text-align:left;"| 2001–02
| style="text-align:left;"| Olimpija
| 20 || 10 || 17.5 || .500 || .433 || .762 || 1.5 || 1.5 ||  1.3 || 0.1 || 4.7 || 5.7
|-
| style="text-align:left;"| 2002–03
| style="text-align:left;"| Olimpija
| 20 || 16 || 30.3 || .486 || .381 || .711 || 1.8 || 2.5 || 1.4 || 0.2 || 11.4 || 11.2
|-
| style="text-align:left;"| 2003–04
| style="text-align:left;"| Barcelona
| 20 || 20 || 27.0 || .426 || .434 || .765 || 1.5 || 2.4 || 1.3 || 0.0 || 9.9 || 8.2
|-
| style="text-align:left;"| 2004–05
| style="text-align:left;"| Barcelona
| 20 || 20 || 27.1 || .374 || .260 || .819 || 1.6 || 2.2 || 1.1 || 0.1 || 9.7 || 8.5
|-
| style="text-align:left;"| 2006–07
| style="text-align:left;"| Roma
| 6 || 6 || 30.2 || .442 || .429 || .700 || 1.8 || 1.8 || 2.2 || 0.0 || 10.3 || 8.7
|-
| style="text-align:left;"| 2007–08
| style="text-align:left;"| Siena
| 24 || 2 || 19.2 || .408 || .344 || .800 || 1.5 || 1.7 || 1.3 || 0.0 || 7.4 || 7.5
|-
| style="text-align:left;"| 2008–09
| style="text-align:left;"| Olimpija
| 6 || 6 || 34.5 || .377 || .317 || .762 || 1.7 || 2.2 || 1.3 || 0.0 || 13.5 || 7.1
|-
| style="text-align:left;"| 2008–09
| style="text-align:left;"| Cerámica
| 11 || 0 || 14.3 || .542 || .385 || 1.000 || 0.6 || 1.6 || 0.2 || 0.1 || 3.5 || 3.5
|-
| style="text-align:left;"| 2009–10
| style="text-align:left;"| Olimpija
| 1 || 0 || 5.1 || 1.000 || 1.000 || .000 || 0.0 || 0.0 || 0.0 || 0.0 || 6.0 || 5.0
|-
| style="text-align:left;"| 2010–11
| style="text-align:left;"| Olimpija
| 15 || 15 || 34.4 || .371 || .319 || .875 || 2.5 || 4.1 || 1.7 || 0.0 || 6.0 || 5.0
|-
| style="text-align:left;"| 2011–12
| style="text-align:left;"| Efes
| 10 || 0 || 17.1 || .267 || .143 || .900 || 1.5 || 2.6 || 0.8 || 0.0 || 2.7 || 3.2
|-
| style="text-align:left;"| 2012–13
| style="text-align:left;"| Cedevita
| 10 || 1 || 20.2 || .434 || .379 || .909 || 1.2 || 1.2 || 0.4 || 0.0 || 6.7 || 5.5
|- class="sortbottom"
| style="text-align:left;"| Career
| style="text-align:left;"|
| 163 || 96 || 23.0 || .465 || .355 || .801 || 1.6 || 2.2 || 1.2 || 0.1 || 8.2 || 6.5

National team
Ilievski was also a member of the Macedonia national basketball team. He played a key role in the Eurobasket 2011, leading the competition in minutes per game and scoring the game winning shot in the quarter finals against Lithuania.

|-
| align="left" | EuroBasket 1999
| align="left" | Macedonia
| 1 || 0 || 15.0 || .600 || 1.000 || .000 || 1.0 || 1.0 || 1.0 || 0.0 || 7.0
|-
| style="text-align:left;"| EuroBasket 2011
| style="text-align:left;"| Macedonia
| 11 || 11 || 37.5 || .313 || .353 || .690 || 2.1 || 3.2 || 1.6 || 0.0 || 10.0
|-
| style="text-align:left;"| 2012 OQT
| style="text-align:left;"| Macedonia
| 3 || 3 || 37.3 || .364 || .304 || .600 || 1.3 || 3.3 || 0.6 || 0.0 || 12.3
|- 
| style="text-align:left;"| EuroBasket 2013
| style="text-align:left;"| Macedonia
| 5 || 5 || 32.0 || .369 || .346 || .750 || 1.8 || 3.6 || 1.4 || 0.0 || 10.6

Personal
He is married to Anja Vilfan daughter of the former Slovenian basketball player Peter Vilfan. They have two sons Luka and Јakup.

He is a younger brother of Dimče Gaštarski who was also basketball player.

References

External links

 Vlado Ilievski at acb.com
 Vlado Ilievski at aba-liga.com
 Vlado Ilievski at fiba.com
 Vlado Ilievski at euroleague.net
 Vlado Ilievski at legabasket.it
 Vlado Ilievski at tblstat.net

1980 births
Living people
ABA League players
Anadolu Efes S.K. players
Basketball Nymburk players
FC Barcelona Bàsquet players
KK Cedevita players
KK Cibona players
KK Partizan players
KK Olimpija players
Liga ACB players
Macedonian men's basketball players
Mens Sana Basket players
Orlandina Basket players
Pallacanestro Virtus Roma players
PBC Lokomotiv-Kuban players
Sportspeople from Strumica
Point guards
Saski Baskonia players
Virtus Bologna players